Grammatiko is a village in East Attica, Greece. Since the 2011 local government reform it is part of the municipality Marathon, of which it is a municipal unit. It is part of Athens metropolitan area.

Geography

Grammatiko is situated in the hills of the northeastern part of the Attica peninsula, 6 km from the South Euboean Gulf coast, at about 210 m elevation. It is 4 km southeast of Varnavas, 5 km north of Marathon and 32 km northeast of Athens city centre. The municipal unit Grammatiko consists of the villages Grammatiko, Agia Marina and Sesi. It has an area of 51.674 km2.

Helios Airways Flight 522 crashed in the hills near Grammatiko on 14 August 2005 after a lack of cabin pressure incapacitated the aircraft's crew members.

Historical population
Grammatiko has historically been an Arvanite settlement.

References

Marathon, Greece
Populated places in East Attica
Arvanite settlements